Lindsey A. Criswell is an American rheumatologist and physician-scientist. She is director of the National Institute of Arthritis and Musculoskeletal and Skin Diseases. Criswell was vice chancellor of research at University of California, San Francisco where she held the Jean S. Engleman Distinguished Professorship in Rheumatology.

Education 
Criswell completed a residency in internal medicine and a fellowship in rheumatology. She is certified as a first responder in wilderness medicine.

Career 
Criswell is a rheumatologist. She was vice chancellor of research at the University of California, San Francisco (UCSF). Criswell was the Kenneth H. Fye, M.D., endowed chair in rheumatology, professor of orofacial sciences in the school of dentistry and held the Jean S. Engleman Distinguished Professorship in Rheumatology. Between 1994 and the time she became National Institute of Arthritis and Musculoskeletal and Skin Diseases (NIAMS) director in 2021, Criswell was a principal investigator on multiple NIH grants and published more than 250 peer-reviewed journal papers. Her research focused on the genetics and epidemiology of human autoimmune disease, particularly rheumatoid arthritis and systemic lupus erythematosus. Using genome-wide association and other genetic studies, her research team contributed to the identification of more than 30 genes linked to these disorders.

In early 2021, Criswell succeeded Stephen I. Katz as director of NIAMS.

Awards and honors 
Criswell won a Henry Kunkel Young Investigator Award from the American College of Rheumatology. She also received UCSF’s 2014 Resident Clinical and Translational Research Mentor of the Year. In 2021, Criswell was elected to the Association of American Physicians.

References

External links 

 

Living people
Year of birth missing (living people)
Place of birth missing (living people)
University of California, Berkeley alumni
University of California, San Francisco alumni
21st-century American women physicians
21st-century American physicians
21st-century American women scientists
American rheumatologists
Women rheumatologists
University of California, San Francisco faculty
National Institutes of Health people
Physician-scientists